Broadview is an unincorporated community in western Franklin County, Tennessee, west of Winchester. Broadview is located on Tennessee State Route 50 around its junction with Tennessee State Route 476.

References

Unincorporated communities in Franklin County, Tennessee
Unincorporated communities in Tennessee